Darko Tanasković (4 January 1948) is a Serbian university professor of Oriental studies, writer, translator, academic and diplomat. Tanasković was the Ambassador of Serbia to Turkey, Azerbaijan, Vatican City, Sovereign Military Order of Malta and UNESCO. He authored over 600 scientific works and articles.

Selected works 
 Pusto tursko (2021)
 Autonomija mišljenja: novi razgovori sa Darkom Tanaskovićem (2016)
 Veliki povratak Turske?: Neoosmanizam ili Islamizam (2015) 
 Belezi vremena (2014)
 Golub koji nije postao ptica (2012)
 Neoosmanizam - povratak Turske na Balkan: doktrina i spoljnopolitička praksa (2010; 2011)
 Islam: dogma i život (2008) 
 Gramatika arapskog jezika (co-authored with A. Mitrović, 2005)
 Jugoistok Srbije: Kontinuitet krize i mogući ishodi (s grupom autora, 2001)
 
 
 
 
 Autonomija mišljenja (2000)
 Na Istoku Zapada (2000)
 Tursko-srpski rečnik (co-author with S. Đinđić i M. Teodosijević, 1997)
 
 U dijalogu s islamom (1992)
 Kontrastivna analiza arapskog i srpskohrvatskog jezika (1982)
 Arapski jezik u savremenom Tunisu (1982)
 Sufizam (co-authoed with I. Šop)
 Arapska poezija (1977)

References 

1948 births
Living people
Writers from Zagreb
20th-century translators
20th-century philologists
21st-century translators
21st-century philologists
Serbian translators
Serbian philologists
University of Belgrade Faculty of Philology alumni
Academic staff of the University of Belgrade
Members of the Academy of Sciences and Arts of the Republika Srpska
Orientalists
Turkologists
Serbs of Croatia